Pandikkudi is a village in Pudukkottai District in the Indian state of Tamil Nadu. It is populated by approximately above Hundred families.

Education 

In Aranthangi taluk, Pandikkudi is one of the village. The Government Elementary school is in this village. Up to 5th Standard students are studying there. Students of this village are educated in many fields. 50% of the village peoples are well educated.

Economy 
The primary occupation is agriculture. Depend on the rain the cultivation is going in this village. Some farmers are cultivating with the help of pore well water. Abroad money also improve this village status.

Temples 

Many Temples are in this village. 1. Kalichchiyamman temple (Tamil: கள்ளிச்சியம்மன் கோவில்) is placed center of the village. 2.  Pillaiyar temple (Tamil: பிள்ளையார் கோவில்) is placed in North East of the village. 3. Pattavar Iyan temple (Tamil: பட்டவர் ஐயன் கோவில்) is placed in North side of the village. 4. Muni temple is (Tamil: முனி கோவில்) also placed in North side of the village. 5. Kaveri Amman temple is (Tamil: காவேரி அம்மன் கோவில்) also placed in North side of the village.

Transport 
Bus facilities are available only in morning and evening except that time people will go to kulamangalm to utilize the transport facility.

External links
 Pandikkudi Village web site

Villages in Pudukkottai district